Bhagawan Chandraprabha Jain Temple is a Jain temple dedicated to the deity Jain, located in the town of Kumbakonam in Thanjavur District Tamil Nadu, India

Other Jain Temples
This temple is situated at Ramaswamy Temple West Street in Kumbakonam.There are also Jain temples in Thanjavur, Mannargudi, Deepankudi and other places in Tamil Nadu.

Structure of the temple
The temple has sanctum sanctorum, front mandapa and maha mandapa. The entrance has no Gopuram. On either side of the sanctum sanctorum sasana devas are found. At the outside of the front mandapa, two guardian deities are found in either side.

Presiding deity
The presiding deity is known as Chandraprabha. This is one of the oldest Jain temples in Kumbakonam. Several Tirttankara idols are found in this temple. He is the Eighth Tirttankara. Worship of Chandraprabha is going on in various places in Tamil Nadu.

Worship
The construction of the temple took place in 1903. Panchakalyana festival took place in 1905. During morning and evening pujas are held to the presiding deity, Brahma deva, Jwalamalini.

Reference

See also

Arihant (Jainism)
God in Jainism
Jainism and non-creationism
Tijara Jain Temple
Jainism in Tamil Nadu
 Tamil Jain

 
Jain temples in Tamil Nadu
Kumbakonam